Menlove may refer to:

People
John Menlove Edwards (1910–1958), leading British rock climber and poet
Coleen K. Menlove (born 1943), general president of the LDS Church from 1999 to 2005
Ronda Rudd Menlove, American politician from Utah
Vaughan v Menlove (1837) 132 ER 490 (CP), leading English tort law case that first introduced the concept of the reasonable person in law

Music
Menlove Ave., a 1986 album by English rock musician John Lennon
251 Menlove Avenue in Liverpool, England, named Mendips, the childhood home of John Lennon, singer and songwriter with The Beatles

See also